The Basel Computational Biology Conference (stylized as [BC]2) is a scientific meeting on the subjects of bioinformatics and computational biology. It covers a wide spectrum of disciplines, including bioinformatics, computational biology, genomics, computational structural biology, and systems biology. The conference is organized biannually by the SIB Swiss Institute of Bioinformatics in Basel, Switzerland.

The next conference
 2021 [BC]2 Basel Computational Biology Conference

List of previous conferences

 2019 [BC]2 Basel Computational Biology Conference "Big Data in Molecular Medicine" in association with BASEL LIFE
 2017 [BC]2 Basel Computational Biology Conference 
 2015 [BC]2 Basel Computational Biology Conference.
 2013 "Genetic Variation + Human Health"
 2012 "ECCB'12, 11th European Conference on Computational Biology" in association with the 10th Basel Computational Biology conference.
 2011 "Multiscale Modeling"
 2010 "Regulation & Control in Biological Systems"
 2009 "Molecular Evolution"
 2008 "Computational Structural Biology"
 2007 "From Euler to Computational Biology" in association with USGEB
 2006 "Comparative Genomics"
 2005 "Biological Systems In Silico"
 2004 "From Information to Simulation"
 2003 "Life Sciences Meet IT"

References

Computational science
Bioinformatics
Computer science conferences
Biology conferences
Science events in Switzerland